, also known as  , is a former Japanese professional baseball outfielder and current manager for the Hokkaido Nippon-Ham Fighters of Nippon Professional Baseball (NPB). Born on January 28, 1972, Shinjo is the second Japanese-born position player to play a Major League Baseball (and the first in the National League) game and was the first Japanese-born player to appear in the World Series.

Career

Born in Tsushima, Nagasaki Prefecture, Japan and raised in Minami-ku, Fukuoka, he played for the Hanshin Tigers in Japan from  until , then for Major League Baseball's New York Mets and San Francisco Giants. In , he became the first Japan-born player to play in the World Series, where he went 1 for 6 with three strikeouts. He ended his three-year stint in American baseball by being demoted to AAA after hitting .193 for the first half of the 2003 season. He returned to Japan and played for the Hokkaido Nippon Ham Fighters from  until . He is known for his flamboyance, colorful wristbands, dyed hair, and a unique hop as he catches the ball. His uniqueness has endeared him to baseball fans and has made him one of the most popular players in the Japanese leagues despite not being in the echelon of elite active players. In fact, his popularity was what kept him off the bench during his stint with the Tigers when manager Katsuya Nomura tried to turn him into a pitcher on the rotation rather than risk his team with his mediocre play.

Shinjo ended his career in storybook fashion. Playing for years on losing teams in Hanshin and despite playing in the 2002 World Series alongside Giants legend Barry Bonds, Shinjo showed emotion and shed tears as his final game crowned him a champion as he was a member of the Fighters squad that won their first Japan Series title since 1962 with a 4 games to 1 series win over the Chunichi Dragons. As Shinjo took the field for the top of the ninth inning in the final game, he was given a standing ovation from the home crowd. Before the inning began, he was visibly emotional. Although the final play was only close to him (left fielder Hichori Morimoto caught the final ball) the cameras all showed only Shinjo's dramatic reaction.  Traditionally, the players toss the manager in the air for series wins first, but the players tossed Shinjo in the air first instead of manager Trey Hillman.

Shinjo is now a television celebrity in Japan as well as a model for his own line of clothing.  He has also won the maximum 10,000,000 JPY prize in a celebrity edition of the Japanese version of Who Wants to Be a Millionaire, Kuizu $ Mirionea.

In October, 2021, Hokkaido Nippon-Ham Fighters announced Shinjo will be the manager of the Hokkaido Nippon-Ham Fighters for the upcoming season. With his hiring, this gave him the nickname, "Big Boss" or "Big Boss Shinjo" by fans, due to his celebrity status and his fun, over the top, unorthodox, clubhouse atmosphere. He was also hired by the Fighters to replace longtime manager Hideki Kuriyama, who became the manager of Samurai Japan at the end of the season.

The success of the nickname made him register himself as BIGBOSS, and on March 24, 2022, just a few days before Opening Day, NPB officially approved BIGBOSS as his registered name for the 2022 season.

During the current 2022 season, Shinjo became well known for entering the field in a home game against the Saitama Seibu Lions in a hoverbike. He also entered his first ever home game as manager, as SB Nation described it, "straight out of wrestling". He also showed up to spring training in a three-wheeled motorcycle. He also has his own jersey with his registered name replacing the nameplate of the Fighters.

MLB stats

Japanese baseball stats

See also
 List of Major League Baseball players from Japan

References

External links

Tsuyoshi Shinjo, JapaneseBallPlayers.com

1972 births
Brooklyn Cyclones players
Hanshin Tigers players
Hokkaido Nippon-Ham Fighters managers
Hokkaido Nippon-Ham Fighters players
Japanese expatriate baseball players in the United States
Japanese expatriates in Indonesia
Japanese racehorse owners and breeders
Living people
Major League Baseball outfielders
Major League Baseball players from Japan
Managers of baseball teams in Japan
New York Mets players
Nippon Professional Baseball outfielders
Baseball people from Fukuoka (city)
Baseball people from Nagasaki Prefecture
San Francisco Giants players